Andreyevskoye is a rural locality (a selo) in Nebylovskoye Rural Settlement, Yuryev-Polsky District, Vladimir Oblast, Russia. The population was 783 as of 2010.

Geography 
It is located on the Yakhroma River, 2 km east from Nebyloye, 27 km south-east from Yuryev-Polsky.

References 

Rural localities in Yuryev-Polsky District
Vladimirsky Uyezd